De Hoeksteen (The Cornerstone) in Barneveld, the Netherlands, is the second largest church building in the Netherlands. It is used by the congregation of the Gereformeerde Gemeenten in Nederland, a highly conservative denomination. The church services are conducted using exclusively the Statenvertaling (Dutch for States Translation) of the Bible.

Construction of the church 
Plans for building a new church were first considered in 2005. The construction began in 2007 and took 18 months. The new 2,531–seat church was opened in 2008. The church tower is 37.75 meters high.

References

External links

 Panorama View of the Church

Churches in Gelderland
Churches completed in 2008
Reformed church buildings in the Netherlands
De Hoeksteen
2008 establishments in the Netherlands
21st-century religious buildings and structures in the Netherlands